Amphigenes is a genus of moth in the family Gelechiidae. It contains the species Amphigenes tartarea, which is found in New Guinea.

The wingspan is about 21 mm. The forewings are dark purple-fuscous. The hindwings are blackish.

References

Gelechiinae
Taxa named by Edward Meyrick
Monotypic moth genera
Moths of New Guinea